Saint-Aignan is a commune in the Morbihan department of Brittany in north-western France. Inhabitants of Saint-Aignan are called in French Saintaignanais.

See also
Communes of the Morbihan department

References

External links

Official website 

 Mayors of Morbihan Association 

Saintaignan